Jila (Zhila) Hosseini (1964–1996), poet, writer, researcher and radio announcer, was born on September 22, 1964, in Saqqez, eastern Kurdistan Rojhalat and was the first woman from Kurdistan to compose modern poems instead of classical poetry.

Short biography

Jila was born in Saqqez in Rojhalat. She had a supporting family and Sheikh Abdul Qadir, her father's grandfather, was a calligrapher and poet. Zhila's father, Sheikh Mehran Hosseini, was a judge of justice and an intellectual. She was born into a traditional culture with cumbersome rules and liked to change those old traditions. Under the situation that all educational Centers including universities and Schools were closed caused by Iranian Cultural Revolution, She got married at a young age but her tendency towards modernity influenced her private life and she divorced once.
At the age of 32 while going to visit the great poet of Kurdistan, Sherko Bekas, she died in a car accident.
After the death of Zhila, Sherko Bekas composed a poem for her:

I dreamed of a fairy angel
I have seen it myself
Jila is now among the clouds
She is sitting on a purple chair
And writes poetry
She is wearing a moonlit skirt

Poems
New Kurdish poetry began its evolution several decades ago and naturally progressed to the advanced stages in Kurdish language literature. Zhila's poems in Kurdish literature helped to open new windows in modern poem. She was the first woman poet from Kurdistan, Rojhalat to compose modern Kurdish poems. She was a pioneer in composing poetry in a modern style among female poets in Kurdistan. She was inspired by Sherko Bekas. There were two different stages in the evolution of her poems. First she didn't has her own language and style but in the second stage she found her own style of composing poems.

‌Books
Some of Jila's poems are published as follows: 

Poetry book (Kurdish) گه شه ی ئه وین (The joy of love), first edition of Sanandaj, 1995.
Poetry book (Kurdish) قه‌لای راز (Secret Castle), first edition of Tehran, 1998. This book was published in three parts.
Part 1: Zhila's remaining Kurdish poems
Part 2: A selection of her Kurdish short stories
Part 3: The Persian poems of Zhila (she had chosen the title of Rain for this collection)

References

External links
A documentary TV program from Tishk TV about Zhila Hoseini Life in Kurdish
Kurdistan Poets Biography IRIB website
A Poet for Poems, Rozhan Noori
24 years after the death, Hawlati News Agency
About Jila, Iran's Poem Website، Saeid Fallahi
Saqqez's Poets Biography  in Kurdish and Persian
About Kurdish Modern Poem, Negah Website
Kurdistan Poem Forough, Mukryan Zaryan Website 
 A library named after Jila Hosseini, an artist from East Kurdistan, was opened, BasNews, 2019
 Inauguration of "Jila Hosseini" library in Saqqez, Kurdpa, 2019

Kurdish-language poets
People from Tehran
People from Saghez
1964 births
1996 deaths
Road incident deaths in Iran
20th-century women writers
20th-century Iranian poets
Iranian women writers